Pachybrachius is a genus of dirt-colored seed bugs in the family Rhyparochromidae. There are about 11 described species in Pachybrachius.

Species
These 11 species belong to the genus Pachybrachius:
 Pachybrachius biguttatus Curtis, 1831
 Pachybrachius capitatus (Horvath, 1882)
 Pachybrachius circumcinctus (Walker, 1872)
 Pachybrachius fasciatus (Fieber, 1861)
 Pachybrachius festivus (Distant, 1883)
 Pachybrachius fracticollis (Schilling, 1829)
 Pachybrachius luridus Hahn, 1826
 Pachybrachius oculatus (Van Duzee, 1940)
 Pachybrachius pictus (Scott, 1880)
 Pachybrachius pusillus (Dallas, 1852)
 Pachybrachius vaccaroi Mancini, 1954

References

External links

 

Rhyparochromidae
Articles created by Qbugbot